Opuntia chlorotica is a species of plant in the family Cactaceae. It is a species of prickly pear native to the southwestern United States and northern Mexico. Its common names include pancake prickly pear, flapjack prickly pear and dollarjoint prickly pear.

This cactus is bluish-green and manifests a bushy to erect form that may attain a height of two meters or more.
Some analysis of the prehistoric range of O. chlorotica has been conducted by studies in the Waterman Mountains of Arizona; these pollen core analyses indicate that this cactus species was present in northern Arizona in late Wisconsinan glaciation period.

References

Notes
 Nathaniel Lord Britton. 1919. The Cactaceae: Descriptions and illustrations of plants of the cactus family  236 pages
 C. Michael Hogan. 2009. Elephant Tree: Bursera microphylla, GlobalTwitcher.com, ed. N. Stromberg
Jepson Manual Treatment: Opuntia chlorotica. 1993

External links

Flora of North America; RangeMap
Calflora images: Opuntia chlorotica
Opuntia chlorotica photo gallery at Opuntia Web

chlorotica
Cacti of Mexico
Cacti of the United States
Flora of the California desert regions
Flora of the Sonoran Deserts
Flora of Northwestern Mexico
Flora of Arizona
Flora of Baja California
Flora of Baja California Sur
Flora of California
Flora of Nevada
Flora of New Mexico
Flora of Sonora
Natural history of the California chaparral and woodlands
Natural history of the Mojave Desert
Natural history of the Peninsular Ranges